Trichonectria is a genus of fungi in the class Sordariomycetes. It consists of 15 species.

References

External links
Trichonectria at Index Fungorum

Hypocreales genera
Bionectriaceae